The Canadian silver dollar was first issued by the Royal Canadian Mint in 1935 to commemorate the Silver Jubilee of King George V. The coin's reverse design was sculpted by Emanuel Hahn and portrays a voyageur and a person of Indigenous descent paddling a birch-bark canoe. The faint lines in the background represent the Northern Lights.  The voyageur design was used on the dollar until 1986. It was then replaced with the 1987 Canadian 1-dollar coin (colloquially known as the "loonie"). 1967 marked the end of the silver dollar as a business strike, or a coin issued for circulation.  After 1967, the dollar coin was made of nickel, except for non-circulating commemorative issues for the collector market, which continue to contain silver.

Varieties

1911
While the silver dollar was not struck for production in 1911, three trial strikes were produced by the Royal Mint in London: two struck in silver and one in lead. Since these coins were unique and not intended for circulation, they have been classified as pattern coins. One of the silver coins, owned by the Royal Mint Museum, has been loaned to the Bank of Canada since 1976 and has been displayed in the Bank of Canada Museum since 1980. The lead coin was not discovered until 1977, during an office move from Parliament Hill. It was then promptly moved to the Bank of Canada's National Currency Collection with its silver counterpart. 

The second 1911 silver dollar had belonged to William Ellison-Macartney, deputy mint master of the Royal Mint. After he died in 1924, the coin was passed on to his three children, before eventually being sold to Blair A. Seaby in 1960. He went on to display the coin to the public for the first time at a Canadian numismatic convention in Sherbrooke that same year, and at an American numismatic convention in Boston a week later. The coin was eventually sold in 1965 to John McKay-Clements, former mayor of Haileybury, Ontario. Following McKay-Clements' death in 1976, the coin was auctioned off again. Due to its uniqueness, it gained the nickname of the "Emperor of Canadian Coins" around the same time the 1911 half-dollar was dubbed the "King of Canadian Coins".

The coin changed hands several more times, being sold to Anthony Carrato of Eagle Coin Company for US$160,000 in July 1979, then Joseph Carlton and David Hirschman of Carlton Numismatics Inc. for US$325,000. Eventually, the coin made its way back to Canada after being auctioned off for US$690,000 to George H. Cook, a renowned Canadian collector, on January 13, 2003. After his death in 2018, Cook's collection was auctioned off during the American Numismatic Association World's Fair of Money in Chicago, where it was bought one final time by Sandy Campbell and Ian Laing for $734,000 after a 20% buyer's fee. They then offered the coin to the Bank of Canada Museum, citing that they want to make sure the coin stays in Canada's public cultural sphere. As part of the National Currency Collection, it rejoined its silver twin and lead counterpart for the first time in nearly 110 years since their mintage.

1947
Ten varieties of the 1947 Voyageur Dollar exist. The ten varieties can be placed into three distinct categories: the Pointed Seven, the Blunt Seven, and the Maple Leaf issue. The mintages for all of these are included on the mintage indicated on the chart below.

Pointed seven
Two styles of the number 7 in 1947 were used in the dies to produce the Voyageur coins. The seven was a tall figure with the lower tail pointing back to the right. 
 On some of the coins, a dot appears near the 7. This is attributed to an imperfection in the die. Six different varieties of the Pointed 7 exist.
Pointed 7
Pointed 7 with a Double-Punched 4
Pointed 7 with a dot near the 7
Pointed 7 with a double punched HP under the effigy of His Majesty King George VI
Pointed 7 with a triple punched HP under the effigy of His Majesty King George VI
Pointed 7 with a quadruple punched HP under the effigy of His Majesty King George VI (The HP is the initials of the designer: T.H. Paget)

Blunt seven
A shorter 7 with the lower tail pointing almost straight down has been labelled as the blunt seven. 
 
Blunt 7
Blunt 7 with a double punched HP under the effigy of His Majesty King George VI

Maple Leaf issue

In 1947, India gained its independence from the British Empire and as a result, the inscription "IND:IMP:" needed to be removed from the Obverse of the 1948 Silver Dollar. However, because there was a delay of new master dies being shipped from the UK to reflect this change, the Mint continued to produce 1947 year coins with a small Maple Leaf by the date to denote they were actually minted in 1948. Eventually the new Obverse dies did arrive, and they began to mint the 1948 dollars midway through the year. The very low mintages of these made the 1947 Maple Leaf and 1948 dollars exceptionally rare, with the 1948 Silver Dollar commanding a very high market price.

1947 with the Maple Leaf near the 7
1947 with the Maple Leaf near the 7 with a double punched HP under the effigy of His Majesty King George VI

1950–1952

Arnprior type varieties
A technical problem emanated during the 1950s that was to plague the Royal Canadian Mint. At each end of the canoe on the Voyageur Dollar, are four shallow water lines. In the process of polishing the dies, parts of these lines tended to disappear. The result was that there were differences in the appearance of the coins from year to year. There were collectors that decided arbitrarily that a certain pattern of partial water lines at the right-hand end of the canoe should be collected separately and command a premium over dollars with perfect water lines or other partial lines configurations. The Arnprior type configurations tended to consist of 2 and ½ water lines at the right. Any trace of the bottom water line disqualified a coin from being considered an Arnprior type.

Varieties of 1952
A modified reverse, with no water lines at all, was put into use in 1952. In addition to removing the water lines, this modified reverse was different because the image of the canoe on the coin had a larger islet tip at the right end. This variety is different from the Arnprior coins in that it was deliberately created.

Origin of the Arnprior name
In December 1955, the Royal Canadian Mint made up an order of 2,000 silver dollars for a firm in Arnprior, Ontario. These coins had 2 and ½ water lines at the right end of the canoe. This was similar to the accidental disappearance of water lines on the versions from 1950 to 1951. The 1955 dollars caught the interest of many collectors and it was this version that led to the term Arnprior being applied to any dollar with an appearance of missing water lines. An even more collectible of the 1955 Arnprior, is given by the die break on the obverse legend, with the result being the joining of the T and the I in GRATIA.

No shoulder fold obverse
An element that was common on every denomination of 1953 was the two obverses that existed. Said obverses are commonly identified as the No Shoulder Fold and the Shoulder Fold. The coinage for the year featured the new effigy of Queen Elizabeth II. The sculptress was Mrs. Mary Gillick and she created a model with a relief that was too high. The centre portion of the effigy was to feature two lines on the shoulder. These lines were supposed to represent a fold in the Queen's gown. As these lines did not appear very well, it was commonly termed the No Shoulder Strap by many collectors. Later on in the year, the Royal Canadian Mint's Chief engraver Thomas Shingles lowered the relief of the model and strengthened the shoulder and hair details. This modified obverse became known as the Shoulder Strap variety.

1957 Arnprior
The 1957 dollar had a reverse that was considered an Arnprior. The reverse featured one water line to the right of the canoe.

1965
Although 1965 would mark a change in the effigy of Queen Elizabeth II, the year would offer five different varieties of the dollar.

Variety 1 and 2
The small beads on the obverse of the coin define varieties 1 and 2. The rear jewel on Queen Elizabeth II's tiara is well attached. The 5 in 1965 has two varieties. There is a pointed 5 (the point is at the bottom) while there is another version with a blunt 5 (the bluntness is at the bottom of the 5 too).

Variety 3 and 4
The large beads on the obverse of the coin define varieties 3 and 4. The rear jewel on Queen Elizabeth II's tiara is well attached. The 5 in 1965 has two varieties. There is a pointed 5 (the point is at the bottom) while there is another version with a blunt 5 (the bluntness is at the bottom of the 5 too).

Variety 5
The obverse of variety 5 features medium beads. Unlike the other varieties, the 5 in 1965 is pointed.

1982 planchet varieties
The 1982 nickel dollar exists on a rolled thin planchet. The normal planchet has a weight of 15.62 grams, a diameter of 32.13 mm, and a thickness of 2.50 mm. The thin planchet consists of incomplete reeding. Its weight is 7.78 grams, a diameter of 31.82 mm, and a thickness of 1.50 mm. It is believed that only two exist.

History of composition
Voyageur

Commemorative dollar specifications

Voyageur mintages and the 1911 silver dollar

Silver content, 1911, 1935–1967

Nickel content, 1968–1986

Commemorative nickel dollar

Commemorative silver dollar series

1935–1980

1981–1999

Note: 1981 was the first year that the RCM issued two different qualities of silver dollars. One version was the Proof, which composed of a frosted relief against a parallel lined background. The second version was the Brilliant Uncirculated. The finish is classified as a brilliant relief on a brilliant background.

2000–2016

Special edition proof silver dollars

References

Silver Jubilee of George V
Currencies of Canada
Coins of Canada